Roger Taylor MBE  (born 14 October 1941) is a British former tennis player. Born in Sheffield, West Riding of Yorkshire, he won 6 singles titles and 10 doubles titles during his career. He achieved success at several Grand Slam tournaments, reaching the quarter-finals of the French Open in 1973, the semi-finals of Wimbledon during the same year and winning back to back US Open Men's Doubles titles in 1971 and 1972. He also enjoyed particular success in 1970, again reaching the semi-finals of Wimbledon, where he achieved a big upset win over defending champion Rod Laver en route, and the semi-finals of the Australian Open. Taylor also reached the semi-finals at Wimbledon in 1967. His career-high ATP singles ranking was world No. 11, though Taylor was ranked world No. 8 in 1970 before the ATP rankings began.

Also, he was ranked number one in the UK in both 1973 and 1974. Additionally, Taylor scored 29 wins and 11 losses at the Great Britain Davis Cup team. He is a member of the AELTC.

Tennis career
Taylor was the sole British member of the so-called Handsome Eight signed by Lamar Hunt to compete in his newly created World Championship Tennis tour in 1968. He was shown how to play tennis by his mother, Lilian, and he used to play in the various parks across Sheffield, such as Weston Park. He often practised by hitting a tennis ball against a wall.

Taylor endeared himself to millions of viewers during his 1973 Wimbledon quarterfinal match against the 17-year-old Wimbledon debutant Björn Borg. Having already been declared the match winner by the umpire following his match-point serve which was disputed by Borg, Taylor voluntarily offered to replay the point. The linesman then questioned by the umpire as to whether he wished to reconsider his decision, changed his "in" call to "out" and the umpire requested that the point be replayed as a "let". Taylor subsequently went on to win the match, but lost to eventual champion Jan Kodeš in the semifinals.

He retired from professional tennis in 1980 and following his retirement he operated tennis holidays. He was Great Britain's Davis Cup captain from February 2000 until January 2004. Taylor also captained the British ladies Wightman Cup team; steering them to their last victory in the competition in 1978. He was awarded an MBE in the 1977 Silver Jubilee and Birthday Honours.

He is currently active on the ITF Seniors Tour and has a singles ranking of 54 as at 2020 in the over 75's category. He won the 70+ title at Woking’s Veterans Open Tournament in 2012. In 2019, he teamed up with Australia's Gordon Waygood to win the Men's 75 Doubles title at the British Open Seniors Clay Court Championships.

Grand Slam finals

Doubles (2 titles)

Career titles

Singles (6)

Doubles (8)

References

External links
 
 
 

1941 births
Living people
English male tennis players
Members of the Order of the British Empire
Sportspeople from Sheffield
US Open (tennis) champions
Grand Slam (tennis) champions in men's doubles
British male tennis players
Tennis people from South Yorkshire